King Mob was a 1970s radical group in London, England. 

King Mob may also refer to:

King Mob (comics), a character in Grant Morrison's comic book series The Invisibles
Kings Mob Productions, a New York-based independent film company
King Mob, a nickname for Andrew Jackson, seventh president of United States
King Mob, a 1958 book by Christopher Hibbert based on the Gordon Riots of 1780